Caulks Creek is a stream in St. Louis County in the U.S. state of Missouri. It is a tributary of Bonhomme Creek.  Fishermen will find a variety of fish including bigmouth buffalo, bowfin, walleye, blue catfish and largemouth bass here. 
 
Caulks Creek has the name of the local Caulk family.

See also
List of rivers of Missouri

References

Rivers of St. Louis County, Missouri
Rivers of Missouri